52 Arietis (abbreviated 52 Ari) is a triple star system in the northern constellation of Aries. 52 Arietis is the Flamsteed designation. The combined apparent magnitude is +5.46, which is bright enough to be faintly visible to the naked eye. Based upon an annual parallax shift of 6.05 mas, the system is roughly  distant from the Earth. The inner pair of this system consist of two nearly identical B-type main sequence stars, each with about five times the mass of the Sun. The tertiary component is a smaller star with 88% of the Sun's mass, and is a common proper motion companion.

References

External links
 HR 927
 CCDM J03055+2515
 Image 52 Arietis

019134
Triple star systems
014376
Aries (constellation)
B-type main-sequence stars
Arietis, 51
0927
Durchmusterung objects